Paanch 5 Wrongs Make a Right is an Indian thriller television series that aired on Channel V India from 27 November 2013 to 17 July 2014. The show deals with the theme of "bullying". The story revolves around a teenage girl named Roshni Kataria who wants to take revenge from five seniors who brutally rag and torture her sister in the college premises eventually leading to her suicide.

Overview
Paanch 5 Wrongs Make a Right is about an 18-year-old Roshni Kataria who wants to become a scientist. She hails from Nagpur, India. Her family consists of two more beings - her father and her elder Sister Neha Kataria. Roshni loves Neha a lot and quite attached to her. Roshni and Neha have a childhood companion in Nikhil who loves Roshni since Childhood. Neha is a strong bold girl where Roshni is bit insecure, soft and timid. Neha aspires to become a writer and destiny takes her to Regents College Mumbai. There, Neha encounters five seniors who are considered "Devils" of the college. The five seniors are in their final year and rule the college. Zara Ahmed Khan - an aspiring singer and graffiti artist, Nihaal Sharma - An aspiring Photographer, Yudhishtir Kharbanda - drunk on his father's political powers, Roy D'Souza - he lives on drugs and Gauri Laada - The Leader of the Gang, A woman who fears nothing with a dangerous attitude. The whole college is feared by them but Neha doesn't give into their demands. Hence she gets tortured by each of them. Her only saviour is Gautam Laada aka Gauti, younger brother of Gauri who has some kind of a mysterious personality.

One day Roshni is shattered upon learning of her sister's death. Having filled with immense agony which turns later into aggression, Roshni decides to skip her US trip and her goal to become a scientist and instead get vengeance. Roshni goes as an undercover and takes admission in the same regents college where her sister was tortured. Roshni vows to take revenge on all evil doers one by one. Roshni devices out a unique plan to befriend the group, to understand their weaknesses and then destroy them. Roshni manages to knock off Zara, Nihal and Roy. But Gauri finds out about her real identity before she can get her hands off on Yudi. The Gang captures her and tortures her brutally. Nikhil decides to stand by her. Roshni also has a friend in 'Shivani' who is in love with Nikhil. She dislikes Nikhil's concern for Roshni. Roshni somehow gathers strength and makes a comeback at Regents College and continues her revenge. She manages to knock out Yudi by this time.

She also manages to defeat Gauri in a race championship at College. Things begin to heat up as the gang tries numerous ways to kill Roshni. But eventually Roshni becomes victorious by foiling their plans and punishing them. Roshni is in love with Gauti, who also pretends to be in love with her. He was also supposed to be in love with his elder sister Neha too. Roshni reaches a point where everyone betrays her. Gauti shoots Nihal and frames Roshni falsely. Shivani testifies against her. It is also known that Gauti is a step brother of Gauri and hates her. In a turn of events, Gauti starts blackmailing Gauri. Seeing no way out, Gauri strikes a deal with Nikhil to get Roshni out from prison if only he could foil Gauti's plans.

Roshni learns of Gauti's misdeeds. Also she learns that Gauti was the murderer of her elder sister Neha, Gauti is actually a womanizer who plays safe initially to use his charm. Neha never showed interest in Gauti for which he forces upon her, When Neha slaps him, he throws her off the terrace. Gauri tries to kill Roshni again. But Roshni survives and schemes to trap Gauri and her gang. The gang is captured after being drugged. Roshni and Nikhil sets up a chamber in Regents College full of traps. Roshni forces each member of the gang to confess their crimes. It is then revealed, that the actual murderers of Neha wasn't Gauti alone but 'Paanch'themselves. Everyone is arrested except Gauri and Gauti who tries to knock each other off in order to survive and falls off the cliff. It was revealed that one of them died at the spot. Roshni returns home and offers love and condolence to Neha. It is suggested that Roshni sets off to US to become a scientist.

Cast
Sheetal Singh as Roshni Kataria
Rashi Mal as Gauri Laada
Ronjini Chakraborty as Zara Ahmed Khan
Shrey Pareek as Nihaal Sharma
Aashish Mehrotra as Yudhishtir "Yudi" Kharbanda
Kiran Srinivas as Roy D'Souza
Pratap Hada as Gautam "Gauti" Laada
Ravjeet Singh as Nikhil Shukla
Aakansha Malhotra as Shivani Rai
Sanjay Batra as Pushkar Kharbanda
Akansha Kapil as Neha Kataria

Reception
Writer Aseem Arora got nominated at the ITA awards along with Director Shashank.

References

External links
Official Website on Hotstar

Channel V India original programming
2013 Indian television series debuts
Indian teen drama television series
Television series about bullying
Television series about teenagers
Television shows set in Maharashtra
2014 Indian television series endings